Aero Designs was an American aircraft manufacturer based in San Antonio, Texas. The company specialized in the design and manufacture of composite kit aircraft.

Its sole design, the Aero Designs Pulsar was later produced by Skystar Aircraft of Nampa, Idaho and then by Pulsar Aircraft of El Monte, California. Each subsequent manufacturer introduced new variants.

Aircraft

References

External links

Defunct aircraft manufacturers of the United States
Manufacturing companies based in San Antonio
Homebuilt aircraft
Defunct manufacturing companies based in Texas